Jack Dawson was an Australian first-grade rugby league and rugby union footballer.

Playing career
After converting from rugby union to rugby league Jack Dawson played in the New South Wales Rugby Football League premiership with Eastern Suburbs in the (1923–24) seasons before joining Balmain in 1926. 

A centre, Dawson was a member of Eastern Suburbs' fourth premiership winning side in NSWRFL season 1923.

Dawson was also a representative of NSW.

In the 1925 season, Dawson coached the rural NSW side Temora, in their local rugby league competition.

References

External links
The Encyclopedia of Rugby League; Alan Whiticker and Glen Hudson.

Australian rugby league players
Balmain Tigers players
Sydney Roosters players
Year of death missing
Year of birth missing
Place of birth missing
Rugby league centres
New South Wales rugby league team players